The Kabul Health Sciences Institute (KHSI) is a higher education establishment for the study of health science, and is situated in Kabul, the capital city of Afghanistan.

References

External links
 Official Site (2019 archive)

 

Universities and colleges in Kabul